Scott David Service (born February 26, 1967) is an American former professional baseball pitcher who played for several Major League Baseball teams, between 1988 and 2004. He also pitched one season in Japan, for the Chunichi Dragons in 1991.

Baseball career

Scott attended Aiken High School (Cincinnati, Ohio) and was signed as an undrafted free agent by the Philadelphia Phillies in 1985.

References

External links

Scott Service at SABR (Baseball BioProject)
Scott Service at Pura Pelota (Venezuelan Professional Baseball League)

1967 births
Living people
American expatriate baseball players in Canada
American expatriate baseball players in Japan
Arizona Diamondbacks players
Baseball players from Cincinnati
Chunichi Dragons players
Cincinnati Reds players
Clearwater Phillies players
Colorado Rockies players
Dayton Dragons players
Indianapolis Indians players
Kansas City Royals players
Louisville Bats players
Louisville RiverBats players
Maine Phillies players
Major League Baseball pitchers
Montreal Expos players
Nashville Sounds players
Oakland Athletics players
Omaha Royals players
Philadelphia Phillies players
Reading Phillies players
Sacramento River Cats players
San Francisco Giants players
Scranton/Wilkes-Barre Red Barons players
Spartanburg Phillies players
Tiburones de La Guaira players
American expatriate baseball players in Venezuela
Toronto Blue Jays players
Tucson Sidewinders players
Utica Blue Sox players